KINX (102.7 FM) is an American news/talk formatted radio station owned by STARadio Corporation and licensed to serve the community of Fairfield in Teton County, Montana, to cover Great Falls.

It was adult hits Sam FM until 2011 when it spun off its format at 107.3 FM and moved to 102.7 FM where it flipped to talk.  The radio studio is located at number 1300 of Central Avenue West in Great Falls.

References

External links

INX
News and talk radio stations in the United States